Odesa National Maritime University is a Ukrainian university in Odesa. It was founded in 1930 and has trained students from over 90 countries in various disciplines related to maritime industry.

References

 
1930 establishments in Ukraine
Educational institutions established in 1930
National universities in Ukraine